This is a list containing the Billboard Hot Latin Tracks number-ones of 1993.

See also
Billboard Hot Latin Tracks

References

1993 record charts
Lists of Billboard Hot Latin Songs number-one songs
1993 in Latin music